The 2017 European Athletics Indoor Championships were held between 3 and 5 March 2017 at the Kombank Arena in Belgrade, Serbia. This was the second time this event was held in the city after the 1969 edition then known as the European Indoor Games, and the first time in more than 30 years that the competition was held in Eastern Europe. The three-day competition featured 13 men's and 13 women's athletics events and took place over two morning and three afternoon sessions.

The decision of Belgrade as the host-city was announced on 4 May 2014 in Frankfurt am Main, beating bids from Istanbul and Polish city Toruń. The host nation's leading athlete was Ivana Španović, who returned to defend her European indoor title in the long jump. The 2017 Balkan Indoor Athletics Championships was held at the Kombank Arena a week prior to the competition. Former athlete Slobodan Branković led the local organising committee. The event had an official website and a social media presence on Twitter and Facebook. The event mascot was decided by competition among Serbian schoolchildren, with the winning design coming from Sladjana Ljubic. A white lion named “Bela”, it reflects Belgrade Zoo's breeding programme for the animals. The event logo was simply a stylised version of the phrase "Belgrade 2017", rendered in a font resembling the natural straights and curves of an athletics track.

Only one Russian athlete, women's long jumper Darya Klishina, was present at the competition, due to the international ban of the All-Russia Athletic Federation in place since November 2015 following systemic doping. Klishina competed as a neutral athlete. Three other Russians were cleared to compete as neutrals, but did not attend. Russia had led the medal table at the competition in both 2013 and 2015.

Poland and Great Britain dominated the medal table, taking 12 of the twenty six golds available between them (7 for the Poles, 5 for the Britons) - of the other competing nations, only Germany and France won more than a single gold, with two each. In the placings table, Great Britain and Poland were inseparable on 103 points each, but Germany came a much closer third.

Men's results

Track

Field

Combined

Women's results

Track

Field

Combined

Medal table

Placing table
In the placing table the points were awarded for every place in the top eight of each event: 8 for 1st, 7 for 2nd, 6 for 3rd, etc.

Participating nations
There was a total of 525 participants (out of the 567 initially entered) from 48 nations. The only federations missing were Georgia, Kosovo, and Liechtenstein.

  (2)
  (2)
  (5)
  (8)
  (1)
  (19)
  (8)
  (3)
  (8)
  (7)
  (5)
  (24)
  (6)
  (6)
  (11)
  (31)
  (41)
  (3)
  (30)
  (7)
  (14)
 Independent Athletes (EAA) (1)
  (2)
  (10)
  (1)
  (26)
  (5)
  (5)
  (2)
  (2)
  (2)
  (1)
  (1)
  (2)
  (13)
  (8)
  (29)
  (10)
  (12)
  (1)
  (12)
  (15)
  (5)
  (34)
  (29)
  (13)
  (13)
  (31)

References

External links

Official website
EAA competition website
Full results

 
European Athletics Indoor Championships
International athletics competitions hosted by Serbia
International sports competitions in Belgrade
European Athletics Indoor Championships
Athletics Indoor Championships
European Athletics Indoor Championships
2010s in Belgrade
European Athletics Indoor Championships